Ceton is a commune in the Orne department in north-western France. It is the southernmost municipality in Normandy.

Heraldry

See also
Communes of the Orne department
 Perche

References

Communes of Orne
Perche